Tesuque  (Tewa: Tetsʼúgéh Ówîngeh / Tetsugé Oweengé ) is a census-designated place (CDP) in Santa Fe County, New Mexico, United States. It is part of the Santa Fe, New Mexico, Metropolitan Statistical Area. The population was 909 at the 2000 census. The area is separate from but located near Tesuque Pueblo, a member of the Eight Northern Pueblos, and the Pueblo people are from the Tewa ethnic group of Native Americans who speak the Tewa language. The pueblo was listed as a historic district on the National Register of Historic Places in 1973.

Geography
Tesuque is located at  (35.746069, -105.922108). Camel Rock is a distinctive rock formation. The landmark is along U.S. Routes 84/285 across from the Camel Rock Studios owned by Tesuque Pueblo.

Demographics

As of the census of 2000, there were 909 people, 455 households, and 249 families residing in the CDP. The population density was 130.6 people per square mile (50.4/km). There were 541 housing units at an average density of 77.7 per square mile (30.0/km). The racial makeup of the CDP was 75.25% White, 0.44% African American, 0.44% Native American, 0.77% Asian, 18.37% from other races, and 4.73% from two or more races. Hispanic or Latino of any race were 35.64% of the population.

There were 455 households, out of which 16.7% had children under the age of 18 living with them, 43.5% were married couples living together, 8.1% had a female householder with no husband present, and 45.1% were non-families. 38.2% of all households were made up of individuals, and 8.8% had someone living alone who was 65 years of age or older. The average household size was 2.00 and the average family size was 2.61.

In the CDP, the population was spread out, with 14.7% under the age of 18, 4.7% from 18 to 24, 23.8% from 25 to 44, 41.3% from 45 to 64, and 15.5% who were 65 years of age or older. The median age was 48 years. For every 100 females, there were 89.0 males. For every 100 females age 18 and over, there were 88.6 males.

The median income for a household in the CDP was $36,029, and the median income for a family was $80,043. Males had a median income of $43,833 versus $42,650 for females. The per capita income for the CDP was $52,473. About 7.3% of families and 12.6% of the population were below the poverty line, including none of those under age 18 and 29.5% of those age 65 or over.

Education
It is within Santa Fe Public Schools.

It is zoned to Tesuque Elementary School, Milagro Middle School, and Santa Fe High School.

Notable people
Carlene Carter, singer and songwriter.
Howie Epstein, American musician, bassist with Tom Petty and the Heartbreakers.
Lynne and Dennis Comeau, shoe designers.
Dominic Frontiere, composer. 
Ali MacGraw, actress and model.
Armistead Maupin, author.
Cormac McCarthy, author.
Anthony Michaels-Moore, opera singer.
Eliot Porter, nature photographer who lived in Tesuque from 1946 until his death in 1990.
Michael Tobias, author.
Carol Jean Vigil, New Mexico's first female Native American state court judge.
Rufina Vigil, painter.

Cultural references
Tesuque is mentioned in Willa Cather's 1927 novel Death Comes for the Archbishop, Book Nine Chapter 1.

There is a passing mention of Tesuque in chapter 6 of the 1932 novel Brave New World by Aldous Huxley.

Tesuque is mentioned in the 1966 novel The Last Gentleman by Walker Percy.

Michael Tobias' 2005 novel, The Adventures of Marigold, is set in Tesuque.

Tesuque is also mentioned in the 2016 Stuart Woods novel "Dishonorable Intentions".

In the final episode of the crime drama series Breaking Bad, the characters Elliott and Gretchen Schwartz live in a new mansion in Tesuque.

In the penultimate episode of the second season of the animated comedy drama series BoJack Horseman, BoJack visits Charlotte Moore who lives in Tesuque in a feeble attempt to rekindle an old romance with her.

See also

National Register of Historic Places listings in Santa Fe County, New Mexico

References

External links

 Tesuque Pueblo at Indian Pueblo Cultural Center website
 Tesuque Pueblo at New Mexico Tourism Dept. website

Census-designated places in New Mexico
Historic districts on the National Register of Historic Places in New Mexico
Native American tribes in New Mexico
Census-designated places in Santa Fe County, New Mexico
Tewa
Pueblo great houses
Northern Rio Grande National Heritage Area
National Register of Historic Places in Santa Fe County, New Mexico
Pueblos on the National Register of Historic Places in New Mexico